Nathan Head (born 8 October 1980) is a British actor, known for his work in the independent horror film Theatre Of Fear as well as the Netflix Robert The Doll series. He trained in Manchester, where he took acting classes at the Northern Actors Centre, whose patrons included Sarah Lancashire, Shobna Gulati and Brigit Forsyth.

Early career
Head first gained attention with his role as demonic Raymond Korkinsky in the award-winning film The Archangel Murders, which was shown at Cannes in 2010. The film had a limited theatrical release in October 2009, playing alongside Halloween and Someone's Knocking at the Door. Head also voiced a character in the animated spin-off Underworld Tales.

Work in the horror genre
Head is best known for his work in the British horror genre, notably his leading roles in the films Theatre Of Fear, the Sony Pictures dinosaur thriller Jurassic Predator and the mockbuster Exorcist Chronicles. Theatre Of Fear entered the Asda UK DVD charts at number 19 and Exorcist Chronicles gained recognition in America upon its release via Time Warner Cable. Both films received positive reviews from Silver Screen magazine, Scream magazine and Rue Morgue magazine as well as being featured in The Guardian and leading genre publication Fangoria magazine, Exorcist Chronicles popularity led to Head appearing on BBC Merseyside to talk about his love for the horror genre and his years of experience in acting in horror prosthetics, creature makeup and special effects makeup.

Filmography

Television appearances

Radio

FM radio
From August 2009 to July 2011, Head appeared on the weekly Matinée Show on 103.6FM, Sundays 15:00 to 17:00. He co-presented the show and read the entertainment news.

Internet radio
Head produced and hosted a feature on Online World Radio called The Showbiz Slot, covering various entertainment-themed subjects. The show was broadcast on Online World Radio in 2010 and released on iTunes as a podcast in 2011, with a second series released in 2012.

Other media
In September 2017, Head recorded a short audio contribution for inclusion in the official eleventh YouTube anniversary video of colorisation artist Stuart Humphryes.

References

External links 
 Official Website
 Official Twitter
 
 Nathan Head interview on (re)Search my Trash

People from Warrington
English male television actors
1980 births
Living people